Brigitte Schockaert (born 23 June 1933) is a Belgian equestrian. She competed at the 1956 Summer Olympics and the 1960 Summer Olympics.

References

External links
 

1933 births
Living people
Belgian female equestrians
Olympic equestrians of Belgium
Equestrians at the 1956 Summer Olympics
Equestrians at the 1960 Summer Olympics
People from Zottegem
Sportspeople from East Flanders
20th-century Belgian women